The Patriot League men's basketball tournament is held at the conclusion of each regular season. The winner of the tournament is awarded an automatic bid to the NCAA Men's Division I Basketball Championship.

Tournament finals results

Sources:

Championships by school

^ Regular season co-champion
*In 2021, Navy finished 12-1, the best regular season winning percentage and received the #1 seed in the league tournament. However, the Patriot League did not award Navy a regular season title due to the unbalanced schedule. Navy played only 5 of the other 9 teams in the league and played more than half of their league games against just two teams.
† Fordham departed the Patriot League in all sports (except football) in 1995.

Postseason results

All-time Patriot League Tournament records
Records 

*Fordham left the Patriot League in men's basketball after the 1994–95 season, with a cumulative tournament record of 7–3 in its 5 seasons with the league. In total Fordham made 2 finals appearances and 4 semi-finals appearances.

All-time regular season standings
Records 

*Adjusted for vacated wins of 2004–05 season. Lehigh finished with a league record of 7–7, but later vacated 6 wins for an adjusted record of 1–13 (per https://www.sports-reference.com/cbb/friv/forfeits.cgi)

**In 2021, Navy finished 12-1, the best regular season winning percentage and received the #1 seed in the league tournament. However, the Patriot League did not award Navy a regular season title due to the unbalanced schedule. Navy played only 5 of the other 9 teams in the league and played more than half of their league games against just two teams.

***Fordham left the Patriot League in men's basketball after the 1994–95 season, with an cumulative record of 46–22 (0.676), 3 regular season titles (1 solo) and winning seasons in 4 of 5 played.

Regular season honors

Broadcasters

Television

Radio

See also
 Patriot League women's basketball tournament

References

 
Recurring sporting events established in 1991